Crimes of the Future is a 1970 Canadian science fiction film written, shot, edited and directed by David Cronenberg. Like Cronenberg's previous feature, Stereo, Crimes of the Future was shot silent with a commentary added afterwards, spoken by the character Adrian Tripod (Ronald Mlodzik).

Although the film shares its title with Cronenberg's 2022 film of the same name, it is not a remake as the story and concept are unrelated, and there is no connection between the two films whatsoever.

Plot
The film is set in 1997. Adrian Tripod, occasional director of a dermatological clinic called the House of Skin, searches for his mentor, insane dermatologist Antoine Rouge, who has disappeared following a catastrophic plague, resulting from cosmetic products, which has killed the entire population of sexually mature women. It has allegedly claimed the life of Rouge himself after the virus mutated to affect men.

Tripod joins a succession of organisations, including Metaphysical Import-Export and the Oceanic Podiatry Group, and meets various individuals and groups of men trying to adjust themselves to a defeminized world. When a House of Skin patient that Tripod had grown close to dies from the plague, Tripod checks into a mental health clinic and engages in foot fetishism and showing off his collection of female underwear to other men.

Tripod aligns with a group of pedophiles who kidnap a five-year-old girl who has been exposed to chemicals intended to force her into puberty in order to impregnate her. However, one of the group is ultimately unable to bring himself to rape the young girl and leaves her untouched. Tripod enters the room where the girl is kept and removes his shirt, before suddenly seeing the girl emit a cream-like white foam from her mouth. Sensing the presence of Rouge in the girl, in the form of the same virus that killed him, Tripod finds his own nipples are producing the same substance. This brings him to the realization that, by artificially inducing puberty in the young child, she has become infected with the plague and that both the girl and Tripod are now going to die.

Cast
 Ronald Mlodzik as Adrian Tripod
 Jon Lidolt 
 Tania Zolty 	
 Paul Mulholland	 
 Jack Messinger	 
 Iain Ewing	 
 William Haslam 
 Brian Linehan
 Raymond Woodley (credited as Ray Woodley)

Analysis
One possible reading of the film is that the audience is witnessing the mad mind of a dual personality schizophrenic pedophile (Adrian Tripod and Antoine Rouge) who is interpreting the outside world as an imaginary futuristic reality where he is first Adrian Tripod, the director of an institute known as House of Skin, but is slowly getting closer and closer to a child molestation crime planned by him and a gang of pedophiles whom he recruits during the scenes of the film, and committed by him as Antoine Rouge later in the film. In the cataclysmic 7-minute finale, Adrian is shown as a madman, revealing that the whole film was about him finding his way to his guilty self (similarly to Cronenberg's later film Spider).

Reception
Kim Newman, in his 1988 book Nightmare Movies, has described Crimes of the Future as being "more fun to read about in synopsis than to watch", and as proving, along with Stereo, that "it's possible to be boring and interesting at the same time".

The film has a score of 50% from six reviews on Rotten Tomatoes, with an average rating of 5.8/10.

Home media
The film has been included as a special feature in multiple releases of other Cronenberg films, including in standard definition on Blue Underground's Blu-ray release of Fast Company, in high definition on Criterion's release of The Brood and also in high definition on a bonus disc in Arrow Video's UK Blu-ray release of Videodrome. The bonus disc from Videodrome was later released on its own as David Cronenberg's Early Works. In January 2023, it appeared as an extra on the 4K UHD of the 2022 Crimes of the Future.

References

External links
 
 

1970 films
1970s avant-garde and experimental films
1970 independent films
Canadian avant-garde and experimental films
Canadian science fiction comedy films
Canadian independent films
1970s science fiction comedy films
English-language Canadian films
Films about pedophilia
Films directed by David Cronenberg
Films set in 1997
Films set in the future
Canadian post-apocalyptic films
Canadian body horror films
1970 comedy films
1970s English-language films
1970s Canadian films